Medveđa is a town and municipality located in the Jablanica District of southern Serbia. As of 2022 census, the municipality has a population of 6,438 inhabitants.

Etymology
The name is derived from the Serbian word medved (медвед), "bear", hence meaning "the place of the bears".

History
During the Roman period, there was a town (mansia) with the name Idimum located in the cadastral area of the modern town. Architectural debris dating to the 4th century AD lay at various locations of the town, as it was a transitory zone of Upper Moesia; travel and postal stations are among the finds.

Toponyms such as Arbanaška and Đjake shows an Albanian presence in the Toplica and Southern Morava regions (located north-east of contemporary Kosovo) before the expulsion of Albanians during 1877–1878 period.
The rural parts of Jablanica valley and adjoining semi-mountainous interior was inhabited by compact Muslim Albanian population while Serbs in those areas lived near the river mouths and mountain slopes and both peoples inhabited other regions of the South Morava river basin. As the wider Jabllanica region, Medveđa also had an Albanian majority. These Albanians were expelled by Serbian forces in a way that today would be characterized as ethnic cleansing. Due to depopulation and economic considerations some small numbers of Albanians were allowed to stay and return though not to their previous settlements and instead were designated concentrated village clusters in the Toplica, Masurica and Jablanica areas. Of those only in the Jablanica valley centered around the town of Medveđa have small numbers of Albanians and their descendants remained. This was due to a local Ottoman Albanian commander Sahit Pasha from the Jablanica area negotiating on good terms with Prince Milan and thereby guaranteeing their presence.

Yugoslavia (1918–92)

Already in 1900, a group of prominent residents of the Upper Jablanica region officially applied to the government for Medveđa to be declared a town (varoš). They also asked for the settlement to be renamed to Dubočica. Only after the fourth try by the local population, Medveđa was declared varošica ("small town") by King Alexander I of Yugoslavia on 31 December 1921.

The World War II hit the town in 1941. Yugoslav Partisans took the town back in 1944 and killed around 200 people. From 1945 until 1992, the municipality of Medveđa was part of SFR Yugoslavia.

Breakup of Yugoslavia (1991–99)

In 1992, the Albanians in the area organized a referendum in which they voted that Medveđa, Preševo and Bujanovac should join the self-declared assembly of the Republic of Kosova. However, no major events happened until the end of the 1990s.

Following the breakup of Yugoslavia, and nearby Kosovo War which lasted until 1999, between 1999 and 2001, an ethnic Albanian paramilitary separatist organization, the UÇPMB, raised an armed insurgency in the Preševo Valley, in the region mostly inhabited by Albanians, with a goal to occupy these three municipalities from Serbia and join them to the self-proclaimed Republic of Kosova. The insurgency was less present in Medveđa than in other two municipalities, due to a small number of ethnic Albanians and minor importance.

Western countries condemned the attacks and described it as the "extremism" and use of "illegal terrorist actions" by the group. Following the overthrow of Slobodan Milošević, the new Serbian government suppressed the violence by 2001 and defeated the separatists. NATO troops also helped the Serbian government by ensuring that the rebels do not import the conflicts back into Kosovo. Thereafter, the situation has stabilized even though large number of forces exist in this small municipality.

In 2009, Serbia opened a military base Cepotina 5 kilometers south of Bujanovac, to further stabilize the area.

Modern
Today, Medveđa is located in the Jablanica District of southern Serbia. On 26 November 2017, the President of Albania Ilir Meta made a historical visit to Medveđa, municipality with Albanian ethnic minority.

Settlements
Aside from the town of Medveđa, the municipality includes the following settlements:

 Bogunovac
 Borovac
 Varadin
 Velika Braina
 Vrapce
 Gazdare
 Gornja Lapaštica
 Gornji Bučumet
 Gornji Gajtan
 Grbavce
 Gubavce
 Gurgutovo
 Donji Bučumet
 Donji Gajtan
 Đulekare
 Kapit
 Lece
 Mala Braina
 Marovac
 Maćedonce
 Maćedonce (Retkocersko)
 Medevce
 Mrkonje
 Negosavlje
 Petrilje
 Poroštica
 Pusto Šilovo
 Ravna Banja
 Retkocer
 Rujkovac
 Svirce
 Sijarina
 Sijarinska Banja
 Sponce
 Srednji Bučumet
 Stara Banja
 Stubla
 Tulare
 Tupale
 Crni Vrh
 Čokotin

Demographics

According to the 2011 census results, the municipality of Medveđa has a population of 7,438 inhabitants. It saw a great depopulation in the past 50 years, having nearly 25,000 inhabitants in 1961 and 7,400 fifty years later. Around 43.5% of inhabitants live in urban areas. As of 2022 census, the municipality has a population of 6,438 inhabitants.

Ethnic groups
The majority of municipality's population are Serbs, numbering more than 65%. Other ethnic groups include Albanians who numbered 32% in 1981 and 26.2% in 2002 census. In 2011 they numbered only 7.1% as they mostly boycotted the census. The preliminary results of the 2022 census showed a total population of 8,594 inhabitants out of which 2,647 (~30%) are Albanians.

There are other small minorities of Montenegrins and Roma people. The ethnic composition of the municipality:

Economy
The municipality of Medveđa is one of the least developed municipalities in Serbia. It has many natural advantages for tourism development, as it is in the vicinity of a spa resort with dozens of mineral springs in Sijarinska Banja, Stara Banja and Tulare.

On its territory there are mineral resources for mining, semi-precious stones and marble-onyx. The most promising branch of industry is mining, having mine and flotation "Lece", within the Group Farmakom. It has also solid prospects for development in agriculture and industries such as livestock (sheep, goats, cows) and fruit (plums, pears, apples, quince), also the timber industry and processing.

The following table gives a preview of total number of registered people employed in legal entities per their core activity (as of 2018):

Politics
Seats in the municipality parliament won in the 2012 local elections:
 Group of Citizens "For North Jablanica" (16)
 Party for Democratic Action (6)
 Democratic Party (6)
 United Regions of Serbia (4)
 Serbian Progressive Party (3)

Gallery

Notable people
 Idriz Ajeti, Albanian historian
 Astrit Ajdarević, Albanian-Swedish football player
 Dušan Spasojević, deceased head of the Zemun clan

References

External links

 

 
Populated places in Jablanica District
Municipalities and cities of Southern and Eastern Serbia
Albanian communities in Serbia